Etozolin (Diulozin, Elkapin, Etopinil) is a loop diuretic used in Europe. It is believed to be discontinued.

See also 
 Ozolinone

References 

Diuretics
1-Piperidinyl compounds
Thiazolidines
Ethyl esters
Lactams